The Montclair Athletic Club was an amateur ice hockey team from Montclair, New Jersey in existence during the late 1890s. Montclair Athletic Club played one game during the 1895–96 season and exhibition games during the 1896–97 season against opponents from New York City and New Jersey, as well as against Queen's University (of Kingston, Ontario) and an All-Baltimore aggregation.

During the 1897–98 and 1898–99 seasons the team played in the American Amateur Hockey League against teams from New York City.

Notable players on the team were Max Hornfeck and Herman Koehler.

Spalding Athletic Library published Ice Hockey guide (with rules) edited by JA Tuthill of the Montclair AC in 1898.

References

Notes

Defunct ice hockey teams in the United States
Sports in New Jersey
Montclair, New Jersey